The 1993 Walker Cup, the 34th Walker Cup Match, was played on August 18 and 19, 1993, at Interlachen Country Club, Edina, Minnesota. The event was won by the United States 19 to 5.

The event was originally to be played at Chicago Golf Club but they withdrew in 1991 because of pressure due to their membership policy relating to minorities and women.

Format
The original format for play on Wednesday and Thursday was the same. There were to be four matches of foursomes in the morning and eight singles matches in the afternoon. In all, 24 matches were to be played. Because of heavy overnight rain the first day foursomes were abandoned. The format was revised so that were 10 singles matches on both days, resulting in an unchanged total of 24 matches.

Each of the 24 matches was worth one point in the larger team competition. If a match was all square after the 18th hole extra holes were not played. Rather, each side earned ½ a point toward their team total. The team that accumulated at least 12½ points won the competition. If the two teams were tied, the previous winner would retain the trophy.

Teams
Ten players for the United States and Great Britain & Ireland participated in the event plus one non-playing captain for each team.

United States

Captain: Vinny Giles
David Berganio Jr.
Todd Demsey
Allen Doyle
Brian Gay
John Harris
Tim Herron
Justin Leonard
Kelly Mitchum
Jay Sigel
Danny Yates

Great Britain & Ireland
 & 
Captain:  George Macgregor
 Raymond Burns
 Stuart Cage
 Bradley Dredge
 Pádraig Harrington
 Paul Page
 Van Phillips
 Iain Pyman
 Dean Robertson
 Raymond Russell
 Matt Stanford

Wednesday's matches

Morning foursomes
The first day foursomes were abandoned because of heavy overnight rain. The format was revised so that were 10 singles matches on both days.

Afternoon singles

Thursday's matches

Morning foursomes

Afternoon singles

References

Walker Cup
Golf in Minnesota
Walker Cup
Walker Cup
Walker Cup